Hale Ashcraft (March 28, 1920 - March 14, 2010) served in the California State Assembly for the 80th district from 1963 to 1967 and during World War II he served in the United States Army.

References

United States Army personnel of World War II
1920 births
2010 deaths
20th-century American politicians
Republican Party members of the California State Assembly